Sajjad Ali Shah (born 14 August 1957) is a Pakistani jurist who has been serving as a judge of the Supreme Court of Pakistan since 15 March 2017. Previously, he served as the Chief Justice of the Sindh High Court.

References

Living people
1957 births
Sindh Muslim Law College alumni
Chief Justices of the Sindh High Court
Justices of the Supreme Court of Pakistan